Albert Claude "Goofy" Marshall (June 18, 1909 – October 8, 1968) was an American football coach. He was the 15th head football coach at The Apprentice School in Newport News, Virginia and he held that position for three seasons, from 1954 until 1956. His coaching record at Apprentice was 4–21.

References

1909 births
1968 deaths
The Apprentice Builders football coaches